The Dark Past is a 1948 American film noir psychological thriller film starring William Holden, Nina Foch, and Lee J. Cobb. Directed by Rudolph Maté, the Columbia Pictures release is a remake of Blind Alley (1939), also released by Columbia, and based on a play by American dramatist James Warwick.

Plot
Police psychiatrist Dr. Andrew Collins (Lee J. Cobb) tells a detective that he believes that he can help to turn a young suspect away from crime.  Through an extended flashback he illustrates his claim with the story of how he came to work for the police.

While Collins (at the time a college professor), his wife, and son head to their vacation cabin, prison escapee and convicted murderer Al Walker (William Holden) and his small gang flee towards the very same secluded cove. Along the way Walker  gratuitously shoots the warden he had held hostage in the back, raising eyebrows around him.

Collins is entertaining three guests when Walker, his girlfriend Betty (Nina Foch), and two gunmen break in and hold everyone hostage while waiting for a pickup by boat. With the servants tied in the basement and the others upstairs guarded by Betty and the gangmen, Collins observes Walker's behavior downstairs closely, explaining that his profession has trained him to cure.

When Fred Linder (Steven Geray), a colleague of Collins, comes to deliver  a hunting rifle, he tells Collins about the prison escape but notices that someone is hiding behind a curtain.  Pretending to leave, Linder grabs the rifle, but Walker struggles with him, wounding Linder.  Throughout, Collins has repeatedly noticed that Walker, an extremely unintelligent, volatile man, is nonetheless drawn to some of his books on psychoanalysis and the subconscious.  Betty, who is told to watch Collins while Walker fitfully sleeps, tells the professor that Walker is prone to nightmares (visualized in negative film images) where he is standing under a leaking umbrella with a paralyzed hand and trapped behind bars.

Walker awakens Collins to suggest analyzing his dreams, and Walker agrees. With Collins' guidance, Walker remembers a scene from his childhood where he hid under a table in a bar and witnessed his father being shot to death by police.  The trauma was intensified because the young Walker had told the police where to find him, and because the boy’s hand was covered with his father's blood, which leaked through the table above him. Collins tells Walker that recovering the lost memory means that his nightmares will not return and that he will no longer be able to kill.

Meanwhile, one of the servants managed to escape and notify the police. The cabin is surrounded. Walker seems ready to shoot it out, but finds that he cannot pull the trigger, even though his fingers are no longer paralyzed.

The flashback ends and the police detective agrees to let Collins analyze the young suspect they had been discussing.

Cast

 William Holden as Al Walker
 Nina Foch as Betty
 Lee J. Cobb as Dr. Andrew Collins
 Adele Jergens as Laura Stevens
 Stephen Dunne as Owen Talbot
 Lois Maxwell as Ruth Collins
 Berry Kroeger as Mike
 Steven Geray as Prof. Fred Linder
 Wilton Graff as Frank Stevens
 Robert Osterloh as Pete
 Kathryn Card as Nora
 Ellen Corby as Agnes

Reception

Critical response
When the film was released the film critic at The New York Times gave the film a positive review writing: "William Holden is excellent as the dream-shackled gunman, who is at once ruthless, nervous and explosively dangerous but who grudgingly complies with the doctor's 'screwball' tactics. As counterpoint is Lee J. Cobb's equally fine portrait of the unflustered scientist who is dedicated to 'curing people not killing them.' And, Nina Foch does a competently restrained job as the gangster's moll, who learns he's suffering from an Oedipus complex. The doctor's house guests, including Steven Geray, Adele Jergens and Wilton Graff, and their captors, especially Berry Kroeger, give unobtrusive but neat characterizations. Neat, too, is the word for this small but well-made Christmas package."

In 2001, film critic Dennis Schwartz gave the film a mixed review stating the film was well acted, but called the film "pure Hollywood hokum."

References

External links

 
 
 
 
 The Dark Past informational site and DVD review at DVD Beaver (includes images)
  by Robert Osborne

1948 films
1940s thriller drama films
American black-and-white films
Columbia Pictures films
Film noir
Films scored by George Duning
Remakes of American films
Films about psychiatry
Films directed by Rudolph Maté
American films based on plays
American thriller drama films
1948 drama films
1940s American films